Planet Soul was a house duo from Miami, Florida, composed of producer George Acosta and singer Nadine Renee.

Biography
They released one album in 1996, entitled Energy and Harmony, and are primarily remembered as a one-hit wonder for their song "Set U Free", which peaked at number 26 on the Billboard Hot 100 in early 1996. Brenda Dee did lead vocals on their second biggest hit, Feel The Music and went on to tour for the group throughout the US and Europe. She was lead vocals on the completion of their debut album, Energy & Harmony which was co-written by Veronica Barrios and produced by the group’s creator, George Acosta.

Nadine Renee's death
On December 2, 2004, Renee died of complications from the delivery of her first child, Liat Nadine Shamir.

Discography

Albums
Energy and Harmony (Strictly Rhythm, 1996) U.S. Billboard 200 #165

Singles

References

Musical groups from Miami
American dance music groups
American house music groups